Park Chan-sook (born 3 June 1959 in Seoul, South Korea) is a South Korean former basketball player who competed in the 1984 Summer Olympics and in the 1988 Summer Olympics.

Television appearances
2020: King of Mask Singer (MBC), contestant as "Six Million Dollar Man" (episode 259)

References

1959 births
Living people
South Korean women's basketball players
Basketball players at the 1984 Summer Olympics
Basketball players at the 1988 Summer Olympics
Medalists at the 1984 Summer Olympics
Olympic basketball players of South Korea
Olympic silver medalists for South Korea
Olympic medalists in basketball
Basketball players at the 1978 Asian Games
Basketball players at the 1982 Asian Games
Asian Games medalists in basketball
Asian Games gold medalists for South Korea
Asian Games silver medalists for South Korea
Medalists at the 1978 Asian Games
Medalists at the 1982 Asian Games